Jonathan Lekkerimäki (born 24 July 2004) is a Swedish professional ice hockey right winger for Djurgårdens IF of the HockeyAllsvenskan (Allsv). He was drafted 15th overall by the Vancouver Canucks in the 2022 NHL Entry Draft.

Playing career
Lekkerimäki made his professional debut for Djurgårdens IF during the 2021–22 season, where he recorded seven goals and two assists in 26 games. This made Lekkerimäki the second most-productive 17-year-old goal-scorer in SHL history after Peter Forsberg, who had seven goals in 23 games. He also appeared in 26 games for Djurgårdens' J20 team where he recorded 20 goals and 15 assists. He missed the last month of the season due to mononucleosis. 

On 1 July 2022, Lekkerimäki was drafted in the second round, 70th overall, by the Vancouver Giants in the CHL Import Draft.

International play

Lekkerimäki represented Sweden at the 2022 IIHF World U18 Championships where he led the tournament in scoring with five goals and ten assists in six games and won a gold medal.

Career statistics

Regular season and playoffs

International

References

External links
 

2004 births
Living people
Djurgårdens IF Hockey players
National Hockey League first-round draft picks
People from Huddinge Municipality
Swedish ice hockey right wingers
Vancouver Canucks draft picks